The 1946 edition of the Campeonato Carioca kicked off on July 6, 1946 and ended on December 28, 1946. It was organized by FMF (Federação Metropolitana de Futebol, or Metropolitan Football Federation). Ten teams participated. Fluminense won the title for the 15th time. no teams were relegated.

System
The tournament would be disputed in a double round-robin format, with the team with the most points winning the title.

Torneio Relâmpago

Top Scores

Torneio Municipal

Playoffs

Top Scores

Championship

Playoffs

Top Scores

References

Campeonato Carioca seasons
Carioca